Club Volei Municipal Tomis Constanța, also known as C.V.M. Tomis Constanța, C.V.M. Tomis or Tomis Constanța, is a Romanian volleyball club based in Constanța. It plays in the 2014–15 CEV Champions League season.
Tomis is ranked 14th (as of October 2016) in the Men's European clubs ranking.

Results 
Divizia A1:
Gold: 2007, 2008, 2009, 2013, 2014, 2015
Cupa României:
Winners: 2005, 2006, 2007, 2008, 2009, 2010, 2013, 2014
CEV Cup:
Semifinalists: 2014
Challenge Cup:
Bronze: 2009
Semifinalists: 2012

Previous names
1996-2002: CSS 1 Midia Năvodari
2002-2005: Volei Club Municipal Constanța
2005–Present: Club Volei Municipal Tomis Constanța

Team

Current squad
As of 5 November 2014

 1  Stanislav Petkov
 2  Robert Vologa 
 4  Bojan Janić
 5  Sergiu Stancu  
 6  Andrey Zhekov
 7  Răzvan Tănăsescu
 8  Dragoș Pavel
 10  Andrei Stoian
 11  Andrei Spînu  
 13  Vencislav Simeonov
 15  Adrian Aciobăniței
 17  Nikola Rosić
 18  Andrei Laza

Staff members 
  President: Sorin Gabriel Strutinsky 
  Vice president: Eduard Martin
  Executive director: Serhan Cadâr
  Team manager: Bulent Cadâr 
  Head Coach: Martin Stoev
  Assistant Coach: Radu Began 
  Physiotherapist: Alexandru Negraru
  Statistics: Marius Pop

See also
 C.S. Volei 2004 Tomis Constanța (women's team)
 Romania men's national volleyball team

References

External links
Official Website 
CEV profile

Romanian volleyball clubs
Sport in Constanța